Ding Zhongli (born 14 January 1957) is a Chinese geologist and officeholder, who is the chairman of the China Democratic League and a vice chairman of the Standing Committee of the National People's Congress.

Biography 
Ding was born in Shengzhou, Zhejiang on January 1957. 

Ding received a bachelor of science with a major in geochemistry from Zhejiang University in 1982. He received a master of science and a doctor of science in paleontology and stratigraphy from the Institute of Geology, Chinese Academy of Sciences in 1982 and 1985, respectively.

Ding's research mainly focuses on the Neogene eolian sediments and ancient climate. He is the current director-general of the Institute of Geology and Geophysics, Chinese Academy of Sciences. He is also the vice-president of the Chinese Society for Mineralogy, Petrology and Geochemistry.

In December 2005, Ding was elected as an academician of the Chinese Academy of Sciences. In January 2008, he was pointed as the vice-president of the Chinese Academy of Sciences. In December 2017, Ding was elected as the chairperson of the China Democratic League, one of the minor political parties in China.

In March 2018, Ding was elected as a vice chairperson of the Standing Committee of the National People's Congress.

On 7 December 2020, pursuant to Executive Order 13936, the US Department of the Treasury imposed sanctions on all 14 Vice Chairperson of the National People's Congress, including Ding, for "undermining Hong Kong's autonomy and restricting the freedom of expression or assembly."

References 

1957 births
Living people
Chairperson and vice chairpersons of the Standing Committee of the 13th National People's Congress
Chairpersons of the China Democratic League
Chinese geologists
Individuals sanctioned by the United States under the Hong Kong Autonomy Act
Members of the 10th Chinese People's Political Consultative Conference
Members of the Chinese Academy of Sciences
Members of the Standing Committee of the 11th National People's Congress
Members of the Standing Committee of the 12th National People's Congress
People from Shengzhou
People's Republic of China politicians from Zhejiang
Politicians from Shaoxing
Scientists from Shaoxing
Zhejiang University alumni